Paul Séamus Reynolds (4 October 1949 – 23 May 2010) was a New Zealand internet advocate in the cultural sector. He was an early advocate of IT systems and the Internet in the cultural sector in New Zealand.

Biography
Born in Scotland on 4 October 1949, Reynolds studied at the Middlesex University, graduating with a BA in the history of ideas in 1983. He then completed an MA in social and political thought at the University of Sussex in 1988.

Reynolds moved to Auckland, working part-time in a Parnell bookshop and becoming a book reviewer. He founded McGovern Online, an internet consulting company, with his wife, Helen Smith, in 1995. For many years a commentator for Radio New Zealand on information technology, he was also an active advocate for the use of public-facing information technology by cultural institutions. He worked with libraries, museums and similar institutions to develop websites that informed, educated and engaged with the general public.

Reynolds held a number of roles, including as a member of the Governance Group of Aotearoa People's Network Kaharoa, board member of the National Digital Forum, adjunct director (Digital Library) to the National Library of New Zealand, board member of the Auckland War Memorial Museum and member of the New Zealand government’s digital strategy advisory group.

Reynolds died of leukaemia in Auckland on 23 May 2010.

Legacy
In 2010 a scholarship was established in memory of Reynolds from funds contributed by the National Library of New Zealand, Internet New Zealand, and friends of Reynolds. The grant, administered by LIANZA, is known as the "Paul Reynolds (No Numpties) Grant", and allows people working in the digital space to spend time at an overseas institution to develop or research specialist digital knowledge.

Scholarship recipients
Past winners of the Paul Reynolds Scholarship are:

Works 
 The Internet: A New Zealand Guide. 1995 
 People Points Blog http://www.peoplepoints.co.nz/
 McGovern Online http://www.mcgovern.co.nz/
 Digital strategies for libraries in the 21st century podcast
 Twitter – Reynolds used @littlehigh as his Twitter account. The account was closed after his death and has since been reallocated to another user.

References

External links 
 http://passthesource.org.nz/2010/05/24/where-are-the-libraries-of-tomorrow-going-to-be/
 https://www.youtube.com/watch?v=z6XnbIYAyw0
 http://publicaddress.net/6638#post6638
 http://beattiesbookblog.blogspot.com/2010/05/paul-reynolds-r.html
 http://passonable.edublogs.org/2010/05/24/a-letter-to-paul-reynolds/
 https://web.archive.org/web/20100830152243/http://www.janetwilson.co.nz/2010/05/the-last-post/
 https://web.archive.org/web/20100525224021/http://internetnz.net.nz/paulreynolds
 http://www.nzherald.co.nz/connect/news/article.cfm?c_id=1501833&objectid=10647184
 https://archive.today/20130117101609/http://www.aucklandcitylibraries.com/blog/scooperonlibraries.aspx
 http://artandmylife.wordpress.com/2010/05/25/searching/
 http://chadtaylormarginalia.blogspot.com/2010/05/but-this-is-punchline.html
 http://www.mcgovern.co.nz/Home/Who/PaulReynoldsInternetConsultant.aspx 
 http://kete.net.nz/site/topics/show/324-in-memory-of-paul-reynolds-kete-contributor
 http://www.thebigidea.co.nz/news/industry-news/2010/may/70054-tribute-paul-reynolds

1949 births
2010 deaths
Scottish emigrants to New Zealand
People from Auckland
People associated with the Auckland War Memorial Museum
New Zealand librarians
New Zealand bloggers
New Zealand radio personalities
Alumni of Middlesex University
Alumni of the University of Sussex
Deaths from cancer in New Zealand 
Deaths from leukemia